Sekondi is one of the constituencies represented in the Parliament of Ghana. It elects one Member of Parliament (MP) by the first past the post system of election. Sekondi is located in the  Sekondi Takoradi Metropolitan Assembly of the Western Region of Ghana. The current Member of Parliament is Hon. Andrew Egyapa Mercer.

Boundaries
The seat is located within STMA of the Western Region of Ghana. It was formed prior to the 1992 December presidential and parliamentary elections.

Members of Parliament

See also
List of Ghana Parliament constituencies

References 

Parliamentary constituencies in the Western Region (Ghana)